Funky Alternatives Seven is a various artists compilation album released in 1993 by Concrete Productions.

Reception
Randolph Heard of Option gave a Funky Alternatives Seven and claimed "manly growling and bleating over lead-footed beats and pop-culture sampling depict a cartoonish cyberpunk world full of diseased machines, rabid Christians, terminal drug abuse and, of course, cop killing." He went on to say "the more techno-oriented cuts, the hyper, plastic rhythms tend to take the sting out of the industrial sound, which turns the crashing guitars, distorted vocals and aura of destruction into mere flavoring for the techno beat."

Track listing

Personnel
Adapted from the Funky Alternatives Seven liner notes.

 Carl Edwards – design
 Judson Leach – mastering

Release history

References

External links 
 Funky Alternatives Seven at Discogs (list of releases)

1993 compilation albums